The Torneo Interfederale Coppa Torino was a summer association football friendly tournament that took place in Turin, Italy in 1910 and 1912. In the tournament participated two teams from Turin and two invited clubs. The first edition was contested by four teams, with semifinals, third place match and final. The second edition provided that home teams played two matches with the guests and the team won with the highest number of points.

Finals

References

External links
 Torneo Interfederale Coppa Torino 1910 at Rec.Sport.Soccer Statistics Foundation.
 Torneo Interfederale Coppa Torino 1912 at Rec.Sport.Soccer Statistics Foundation.

Defunct Italian football friendly trophies
1909–10 in European football
1911–12 in European football
1909–10 in Italian football
1911–12 in Italian football
1909–10 in Swiss football
1911–12 in Swiss football
1910 establishments in Italy